Shuko Aoyama and Renata Voráčová were the defending champions, but lost in the quarterfinals to Kristie Ahn and Lauren Davis.

Han Xinyun and Darija Jurak won the title, defeating Alexa Guarachi and Erin Routliffe in the final, 6–3, 6–2.

Seeds

Draw

Draw

References
 Main Draw

Citi Open - Women's Doubles